Tor Mikkel Wara (born 27 December 1964) is a Norwegian politician from the Progress Party, who has served as Justice and Immigration Minister from 2018 to 2019 after the resignation of Sylvi Listhaug.

Biography

Early career
Wara was born in Karasjok, and was a member of the Oslo municipality council between 1987 and 1989. During the same period he was the chairman of the Youth of the Progress Party, and became known as a young rising star within the party. He was elected to the Norwegian Parliament for the Progress Party from Oslo in 1989, and became deputy leader of the party in 1991.

In 1993, he left the Progress Party and quit active politics. While he was one of the main players of the young libertarians within the party in the early 1990s, he was contrary to popular belief not part of the "Dolkesjø" incident in 1994, having left the party the year before.

Later career
As the leadership of the Progress Party in 2006 changed hands from Carl I. Hagen to Siv Jensen, Wara was before the 2009 election spoken of as a possible Minister of Finance for the party in an eventual government, with the recent broad popular support for the party.

Minister of Justice
On 4 April 2018, he was appointed Minister of Justice by Erna Solberg, following the resignation of Sylvi Listhaug making a controversial post on Facebook.

On 30 April, Wara took part in a Dagsrevyen debate with the Governing Mayor of Oslo, Raymond Johansen regarding immigration in Oslo. Wara notably blamed gang criminality on the increase of immigration in the capital. He further added that gang issues was attributed to ethnic and cultural issues, and that it was the reason for why it was important to stop immigration in Oslo. Johansen defended the city's handling of immigration, citing increase in borough spending and the strengthening of kindergartens and better opportunities to learn Norwegian.

In November 2018, a photo of Wara's private residence was used on stage for political commentary in the play Ways of Seeing, a production of the Black Box theatre in Oslo.
Wara's long-term live-in partner Laila Anita Bertheussen along with Prime Minister Erna Solberg sharply criticized the production for exposing the Wara household in this manner, and in December 2018, Bertheussen filed a formal complaint against the theatre.

On 7 December 2018, Wara condemned the threats and called it "an attack on Norwegian democracy. It's bad and serious".

Over the following months, the family received threatening letters and their house was vandalized with graffiti, before the apparent harassment culminated on 10 March 2019 with an arson attack on their car. Wara took a leave of absence on 15 March, with Jon Georg Dale serving as acting justice minister until further. 
However, four days after the arson attack, Bertheussen was arrested on suspicion of having staged the entire harassment campaign herself, prompting Wara to resign his position on 28 March.

The trial concluded on 13 November 2020. Accused of endangering democracy, Bertheussen potentially faced up to 16 years in prison. On 15 January 2021, she was sentenced to one year and eight months prison for three of four charges.

References

1964 births
Living people
Progress Party (Norway) politicians
Members of the Storting
People from Karasjok
20th-century Norwegian politicians
Ministers of Justice of Norway